The Perfect Crime is a 1928 American part-talkie crime drama film directed by Bert Glennon and starring Clive Brook, Irene Rich and Ethel Wales. It is loosely based on the 1892 novel The Big Bow Mystery by Israel Zangwill.

A criminologist sets out to prove there is such a thing as a perfect crime, and commits a murder without leaving any clues. However, when an innocent man is arrested for the crime he is presented with a moral dilemma.

This was the first feature film not produced by either Warner Bros. or Fox Film to contain synchronized sound, also being the first non-Warner feature to contain any talking sequences.

Cast
 Clive Brook as Benson 
 Irene Rich as Stella 
 Ethel Wales as Mrs. Frisbie 
 Carroll Nye as Trevor 
 Gladys McConnell as Mrs. Trevor 
 Edmund Breese as Wilmot 
 James Farley as Jones
 Phil Gastrock as Butler 
 Tully Marshall as Frisbie 
 Jane La Verne as Trevor Baby 
 Lynne Overman as Newlywed

References

Bibliography
 Ken Wlaschin. Silent Mystery and Detective Movies: A Comprehensive Filmography. McFarland, 2009.

External links
 

1928 films
1928 crime drama films
1920s English-language films
American crime drama films
Films directed by Bert Glennon
Film Booking Offices of America films
Transitional sound films
1920s American films